Triplophysa gerzeensis is a species of stone loach in the genus Triplophysa. It is endemic to Tibet.

References

G
Endemic fauna of Tibet
Freshwater fish of China
Fish described in 1988